Riikka Pakarinen (née Pakarinen, formerly Manner; born August 24, 1981 in Varkaus, Finland) is a Finnish politician who served as a Member of the European Parliament from 2009 until 2014. She represents the Centre Party.

She was elected to the Varkaus city council in 2008. In 2009, she was elected to the European Parliament.

References

External links
 

1981 births
Living people
People from Varkaus
Centre Party (Finland) politicians
Centre Party (Finland) MEPs
MEPs for Finland 2009–2014
21st-century women MEPs for Finland